Blacklead may refer to:

 Graphite, also known as "black lead"
 Blacklead, another name for the Plumbago drawing style and medium
 Blacklead Island, Nunavut, Canada